Talkh Ab Rural District is a rural district (dehestan) in Khenejin District , Farahan County, Markazi Province, Iran. At the 2006 census, its population was 6,956, in 2,075 families. The rural district has 16 villages.

References 

Rural Districts of Markazi Province
Farahan County